The Yabucoa Fire Station, at 22 Luis Munoz Rivera St. in Yabucoa, Puerto Rico, was built in 1943.  It was listed on the National Register of Historic Places in 2013.

It has also been known as Parque de Bombas de Yabucoa.

References

San Juan–Caguas–Guaynabo metropolitan area
Fire stations on the National Register of Historic Places in Puerto Rico
Art Deco architecture in Puerto Rico
Government buildings completed in 1943
Yabucoa, Puerto Rico
1943 establishments in Puerto Rico